Hendijan-e Sharqi Rural District is a rural district (dehestan) in the Central District of Hendijan County, Khuzestan Province, Iran. At the 2006 census, its population was 2,479, in 516 families.  The rural district has 11 villages.

References 

Rural Districts of Khuzestan Province
Hendijan County